Just Across the Street is a 1952 American comedy film directed by Joseph Pevney and starring Ann Sheridan and John Lund.

Plot
Henrietta applies for a job as a social secretary for the wealthy Medford family, and while at their residence is mistaken for the spoiled daughter of the house by a young plumber. Rejected for a job at the house, she instead is employed as secretary by Fred the plumber who still thinks she is a rich girl, but believes she wants to do something useful in this life. As she is attracted by Fred, Henrietta keeps up this façade, even to the point of letting him drive her home to the wealthy section of town, only to then catch the bus to her real home. Further complications ensue when both Mr. Medford and his wife believe that the other is having a secret affair with Henrietta and Fred, respectively.

Cast
 Ann Sheridan as Henrietta Smith 
 John Lund as Fred Newcombe 
 Robert Keith as Walter Medford 
 Cecil Kellaway as Pop Smith 
 Harvey Lembeck as Al  
 Natalie Schafer as Gertrude Medford  
 Alan Mowbray as Davis 
 Billie Bird as Pearl 
 George Eldredge as John Ballanger

References

Bibliography
 Daniel Bubbeo. The Women of Warner Brothers: The Lives and Careers of 15 Leading Ladies, with Filmographies for Each. McFarland, 2001.

External links
 
 
 

1952 films
1952 comedy films
American comedy films
Films directed by Joseph Pevney
Universal Pictures films
American black-and-white films
1950s English-language films
1950s American films